Eugène-Édouard Monod (16 June 1871 – 9 November 1929) was a Swiss architect.

In 1912 he won a gold medal together with Alphonse Laverrière in the art competitions of the Olympic Games. They created a "Building plan of a modern stadium". He was part of the architects team whose design for the Reformation Wall was chosen in 1908.

References

External links
 
 profile

1871 births
1929 deaths
Swiss architects
Olympic competitors in art competitions
Olympic gold medalists in art competitions
Medalists at the 1912 Summer Olympics